Saint Egidien is the German name for the saint known in English as St. Giles. It may refer to:

St Egidien, Nuremberg, a church
Sankt Egidien, a municipality in Saxony
Sankt Egidien station, the railway station in that municipality